Jarkko Kalervo Nieminen (born 23 July 1981) is a Finnish former professional tennis player. His highest ranking of world No. 13, achieved in July 2006, is a Finnish record. He has won two ATP singles titles and five doubles titles in his career. His best performances in Grand Slam tournaments have been reaching the quarterfinals of the 2005 US Open, the 2006 Wimbledon Championships, and the 2008 Australian Open.

Statistically Finland's best player to date, Nieminen is also the first and so far only Finnish player to have won an ATP singles title and to have reached the quarterfinals of a Grand Slam singles event. He is also notable for winning the shortest recorded Masters Tour tennis match in Open Era history, defeating Bernard Tomic in just 28 minutes and 20 seconds in the first round of the 2014 Sony Open Tennis. He was ranked inside the Top 75 11 times in 14 years (2001 to 2014).

On 23 June 2015, he announced his retirement from professional tennis at the end of the season, playing 2015 Stockholm Open as his last event.

His wife, Anu Nieminen, is Finland's top-ranked badminton women's single player.

In April 2016, it was announced that Nieminen will compete in floorball in season 2016–2017 at Finnish Salibandyliiga representing SC Classic.

Junior career
As a junior Nieminen reached as high as No. 9  in the world in 1999 (and No. 20 in doubles), and won the 1999 Jr US Open.

Career highlights

1999
Defeated Kristian Pless of Denmark to win his first junior Grand Slam, the US Open.
Finished the year at No. 11 in the world junior rankings.
Made his Davis Cup debut against Italy, losing to Andrea Gaudenzi.

2000
Won his first Davis Cup match, beating Mikael Tillström of Sweden in a dead-rubber.

2001: Breaking the top 100
Became the first Finn to reach an ATP final since Leo Palin in 1981, beating Pless, Younes El Aynaoui, defending champion Thomas Johansson and three-time winner Thomas Enqvist, before losing to Sjeng Schalken in five sets in Stockholm.
Posted a 38–12 Challenger record, winning four titles.
Finished the year in the top 100 for the first time.

2002: Breaking the top 50
Reached clay-court finals in Estoril and Majorca, losing to David Nalbandian and Gastón Gaudio, respectively.
Became the first Finnish player to end the season in the top 50.

2003
Reached his fourth career ATP final in Munich, losing to Roger Federer.
Advanced to the fourth round at the 2003 French Open, losing to Fernando González.
Achieved Finland's first Wimbledon seeding (30)
Was at best ranked World No. 27, a career-high until 2006.

2004
Represented Finland at the 2004 Summer Olympics in Athens, losing to Max Mirnyi in the second round.
Finished in the top 100 for the fourth consecutive year, despite missing nearly three months due to injury.

2005
Defeated world no. 7 Andre Agassi in a first round five-setter at the 2005 French Open.
Was defeated in five sets by Lleyton Hewitt in the quarterfinals of the 2005 U.S. Open, having become the first Finn to reach a Grand Slam quarterfinal.

2006: First ATP title
Won his first ATP singles title in January by defeating Mario Ančić in the final in Auckland.
Recorded his career-best ATP Masters Series performance by reaching the quarterfinals of the Indian Wells Masters, but lost to Paradorn Srichaphan.
Broke into the top 20 for the first time in his career in April.
Reached the quarterfinals of the 2006 Wimbledon Championships, but lost to World No. 2 Rafael Nadal in straight sets.
Broke into the top 15 for the first time in his career in July after his Wimbledon success.
Reached the quarterfinals of the Canada Masters, losing to Andy Murray.
Reached his sixth career ATP final in Stockholm, losing to James Blake.
Finished the season by reaching the quarterfinals of the Paris Masters, where he lost to Tommy Robredo.

2007: 200 wins
Won his first ATP doubles title in September, paired with Robert Lindstedt. They beat Aisam-ul-Haq Qureshi and Rohan Bopanna in Mumbai, India on hard courts.
His best singles performance in 2007 came at Davidoff Swiss Indoors, where he was beaten in the finals by World No. 1 Roger Federer in straight sets, 6–3, 6–4. En route to the finals, he had beaten Robby Ginepri, Guillermo Cañas, World No. 8 Fernando González, and Marcos Baghdatis.

2008
Lost to Michaël Llodra in the final at the Adelaide International, 3–6, 4–6.
Made the quarter-finals at the Australian Open, losing in straight sets to Rafael Nadal.
Represented Finland at the 2008 Summer Olympics in Beijing, losing to Swede Thomas Johansson in the first round.

2009
Defeated top seed Novak Djokovic in the 2009 Medibank International semifinal, 6–4, 7–6. He lost to David Nalbandian in the final, 4–6, 7–6, 2–6.
Withdrew from the 2009 Australian Open halfway through his first-round clash with 28th seed Paul-Henri Mathieu.
Underwent surgery for a wrist injury and sidelined for three months, thus missing Roland Garros and Wimbledon.
Returned to professional tennis at the New Haven tournament in the US in August.
Defeated Frenchman Stéphane Robert in the ATP Challenger tournament final in Jersey, United Kingdom in November.

2010
Defeated Nick Lindahl in the first round of the Australian Open, before losing a tight five-set match to Florent Serra in the second round after having two match points in the fourth set. In the doubles competition, he reached the semifinals with partner Michael Kohlmann, losing to the top seeds Bob Bryan and Mike Bryan.
Reached his first semifinal of the season at the Delray Beach International Tennis Championships, beating Paolo Lorenzi, 6–3, 6–4, in the first round, Evgeny Korolev, 5–7, 6–1, 6–0, in the second round, winning 12 consecutive games to close out the match, and finally third seed Benjamin Becker in the quarterfinals. In the semifinals, he lost against Ernests Gulbis of Latvia, who ended up winning the tournament against Ivo Karlović in the final.
Won his second doubles title with Swede Johan Brunström in Gstaad, Switzerland on clay courts.
Lost to Guillermo García López in the PTT Thailand Open final, 6–4, 3–6, 6–4.

2011: 300 wins
Reached his 11th career ATP final in Stockholm, losing to Gaël Monfils.

2012: 2nd ATP Title
Nieminen won the Sydney International for his second career title against Julien Benneteau. He was a finalist in doubles in the same tournament with Matthew Ebden against Mike Bryan and Bob Bryan.
He was a quarterfinalist at the Open Sud de France and in Rotterdam.
In the 2012 Summer Olympics, Nieminen lost to Andy Murray in the second round, who went on to win Gold in the singles and Silver in the mixed doubles.

2013
 Nieminen was the runner-up at the Power Horse Cup in Düsseldorf, beating no. 14 Tommy Haas.
 Nieminen reached a Masters quarterfinal for the first time since 2006 after beating no. 7 Juan Martín del Potro in the third round of the Monte-Carlo Masters. He also reached the third round in Indian Wells and Miami.
Nieminen was a quarterfinalist at the Valencia Open 500, the Japan Open, and the Sydney International.
He was semifinalist at the Open Sud de France, losing to Richard Gasquet.
He won the Helsinki Challenger.
He won his third doubles title at the BMW Open with Dmitry Tursunov.

2014
 Nieminen started the year 13th time in a row in the top 100.
 He reached the Open Sud de France and Malaysian Open semifinals and the third round of the Indian Wells Masters and the Madrid Masters.
 He played the shortest recorded Masters tennis match, defeating Bernard Tomic at the Miami Masters in 28 minutes and 20 seconds.
 Reached the second round in three of the four Grand Slams, one of the longest Wimbledon tiebreakers losing to ninth seed John Isner.
 He won his fourth doubles title at the Bet-at-home Cup Kitzbühel, the first by an all-Finnish team, with Henri Kontinen.

2015: 400 wins and retirement

At Wimbledon, Nieminen, who had already announced his retirement at the end of the season, played Lleyton Hewitt in the first round, with Hewitt also stating his intention to retire before the 2016 event. Nieminen earned his first win over Hewitt in five gruelling sets. At the US Open, Nieminen faced Jo-Wilfried Tsonga in the first round, with Tsonga prevailing in straight sets despite Jarkko's best efforts. Afterwards, he confirmed that this was his last match at a grand slam.

Nieminen played his final ATP match on 20 October at the 2015 Stockholm Open, losing 6–3, 6–7, 4–6 to Nicolás Almagro. Jarkko had match points in the second-set tiebreaker but narrowly missed one and was very unlucky to lose the other. Fellow Scandinavian tennis player Robin Söderling was in attendance to pay tribute to Jarkko and the Finn was visibly moved as he gave his farewell speech. His final official match was against his old friend and rival Roger Federer at the Hartwall Arena, Helsinki on the ninth of November.

2016: Comeback at the Davis Cup
Nieminen came out of retirement in order to play for his country at the Davis Cup against Zimbabwe. He won his singles tie with a so-called triple bagel with a victory over Courtney John Lock, making him the first player to win by such a scoreline at any tournament since 2011, and one of two players to accomplish the feat on that day (Emilio Gómez of Ecuador earned a triple-bagel victory over Adam Hornby of Barbados at Davis Cup competition elsewhere).

ATP career finals

Singles: 13 (2 titles, 11 runner-ups)

Doubles: 9 (5 titles, 4 runner-ups)

ATP Challenger and ITF Futures finals

Singles: 15 (10–5)

Doubles: 14 (6–8)

Junior Grand Slam finals

Singles: 1 (1 title)

Doubles: 1 (1 runner-up)

Performance timelines

Singles

Doubles

Best Grand Slam results details

Record against top 10 players

Nieminen's record against those who have been ranked in the top 10, with active players in boldface.

Top 10 wins

Singles

He has a  record against players who were, at the time the match was played, ranked in the top 10.

Doubles
He has a  record against players who were, at the time the match was played, ranked in the top 10.

Records
 These records were attained in the Open Era of tennis.

References

External links

 Jarkko Nieminen's official website
 
 
 
 Nieminen World ranking history

1981 births
Living people
Finnish male tennis players
Olympic tennis players of Finland
People from Masku
Tennis players at the 2004 Summer Olympics
Tennis players at the 2008 Summer Olympics
Tennis players at the 2012 Summer Olympics
US Open (tennis) junior champions
Grand Slam (tennis) champions in boys' singles
Sportspeople from Southwest Finland